Kydavone Souvanny (Lao: ກີດາວອນ ສຸວັນນີ (born 22 December 1999) is a Laotian professional footballer who plays as a right winger for the club Young Elephants FC in Lao League 1. He also plays for the Laos national team.

Career statistics

International

International Goals
Scores and results list Laos' goal tally first.

References

1999 births
Living people
Laos international footballers
Laotian footballers
People from Champasak province
Association football wingers